Alain Garant (born 21 March 1952 in Montmagny, Quebec) was a Liberal party member of the House of Commons of Canada. He was a Chartered Accountant by career.

He won the Bellechasse, Quebec electoral district in the 1980 federal election and served in the 32nd Canadian Parliament. He left national politics after his defeat in that riding in the 1984 election.

Electoral record (partial)

External links
 

1952 births
Liberal Party of Canada MPs
Living people
Members of the House of Commons of Canada from Quebec
People from Montmagny, Quebec